Carisma de Alquiler  is a covers compilation by concept band Mujeres Encinta. It was released on a limited edition cassette only in Spain in 2001 by [PIAS] Spain. The cassette contained Spanish versions from a wide range of songs by Sparks, Eggstone, Brian Eno, Steve Reich, Pierre Henry and a couple of Spanish bands.

Track listing
 "Ella Es Demoledora" (Farmacia de Guardia) – 2:02
 "Verano Y Buscando Un Trabajo" (Eggstone) – 3:40
 "Enamorándome De Mí Otra Vez" (Sparks) – 3:10
 "Nada Que Hacer" (The Pastels) – 3:45
 "Vendré Corriendo" (Brian Eno) -4:02
 "17 años" (Los Ángeles Azules)  3:00
 "Psico Rock" (Pierre Henry) - 2:50
 "Va A Llover" (Steve Reich) – 9:50
 "Ceremonia" (Joy Division / New Order ) – 4:10
 "Soy La Mosca" (Wire) – 3:15

 Spanish versions of all songs by Mujeres Encinta

References

External links 
  [Mujeres Encinta fan site]
  [discogs]

2001 compilation albums
PIAS Recordings compilation albums